The Carlos Palanca Memorial Awards for Literature winners in the year 2001 (rank, title of winning entry, name of author):


English division
Short story
 First prize: "The Death of Fray Salvador Montano, Conquistador of Negros" by Rosario Lucero
 Second prize: "White Elephants" by Angelo Rodriguez Lacuesta
 Third prize: "Lyra" by Lakambini Sitoy

Poetry
 First prize: "Pillage and Other Poems" by Alfred Yuson
 Second prize: "The Shortest Distance" by Conchitina Cruz
 Third prize: "To The Dreamer of Last Things" by John Labella

Short story for children
 First prize: "Apo Mayor" by Grace Chong
 Second prize: "The Ghost of Maria Matalas" by Irene Limpe
 Third prize: "Nor Has Ear Heard" by Marie Louise Kalaw Santos

Essay
 First prize: "Cogito Ergo Sum, or What I Know for Sure I Learned from Science" by Queena Lee-Chua
 Second prize: "Lengua Estopado Does Not Mean Stupid Language" by Ernie Zarate
 Third prize: "Satellite of Hate" by Tad Ermitano

Full Length Play
 First prize: "Maragtas: How Kapinangan Tricked Sumakwel Thrice" by Leoncio Deriada
 Second prize: "The Dreamweavers" by Rodolfo Vera
 Third prize: "War Booty" by Christopher Gozum ??

One-act play
 First prize: No winner
 Second prize: "In The Gray" by Glenn Sevilla Mas
 Third prize: No winner

Future Fiction
 First prize: "Turtle Season" by Timothy Montes
 Second prize: "Past Forward" by Maria Fres-Felix
 Third prize: "The Third Placed Coming" by Antonio Hidalgo

Filipino division
Short story in Filipino
 First prize: "Ang Apo ni Lola Soledad" by Edgardo Maranan
 Second prize: "Ang Baliw ng Bayan ng Sili" ni Roy V. Aragon
 Third prize: "Kalayo" by Gil Olea Mendoza

Poetry in Filipino
 First prize: "Mga Lagot na Liwanag" Michael Coroza
 Second prize: "Nakatanim ng Granada Ang Diyos" by Rebecca Anonuevo
 Third prize:  "Ang Paghagilap sa Karaniwan" by Eugene Evasco

Short story for children in Filipino
 First prize: "Sandosenang Sapatos" by Dr. Luis Gatmaitan
 Second prize: "Ang Madyik ni Paolo" by Glenda Oris
 Third prize: "Ang Mahiwagang Kahon" by Dencel Limbo-Aquino

Essay in Filipino
 First prize: "Mga Pilat Sa Pilak" by Eugene Evasco
 Second prize: "Ang Kumbento, Ang Aklatan at Ang Casa Tribunal ng Candon" by Reynaldo Duque
 Third prize: "Sari-Saring Paninda" by Jing Castro Panganiban

Future Fiction in Filipino
 First prize: "Ampalaya" by Reuel Molina Aguila
 Second prize: "Ima" by Jimmuel Naval
 Third prize: "Ang Pamilyang Kumakain ng Lupa" by Khavn De La Cruz

Full-length play in Filipino
 First prize: "Last Order sa Penguin" by Chris Martinez
 Second prize: "Iraya" by Edward Perez
 Third prize: "Indio Anakbanua" by Allan Librada Panlileo

One-act play in Filipino
 First prize: "Resureksiyon" by Jose Victor Z. Torres
 Second prize: "Sardinas" by Ferdinand Jarin
 Third prize: "Kumpit: Sa Ngalan ng Krus at ng Kris" by Aurora Yumul

Teleplay
 First prize: "A Date With Jao Mapa" by Enrique Belo Henares
 Second prize: "Pick Up" by Althea Lauren Ricardo
 Third prize: "San Nicolas" by Tomas Agulto

Screenplay
 First prize: "Ligalig" by Roy Iglesias
 Second prize: "Pagkatapos ng Paalam" by Ma. Rebecca Arcega
 Third prize: "Bayad Luha" by Edward Mark Meily

Ilokano Short story
 First prize: "Ysabelo" by Reynaldo Duque
 Second prize: "Dagiti Maris Ti Bannagaw" by William Alvarado
 Third prize: "Ti Wagayway, Ni Lakay Pedro Salacnib Ken Maysa A Bigat" by Arnold Pascual Jose

Cebuano Short story
 First prize: "Ang Bata Nga Dili Matulog" by Macario Tiu
 Second prize: "Tuli" by Arturo Penaserada
 Third prize: "Takna sa Kagabhion" by Ricardo Patalinjug

Hiligaynon Short story
 First prize: "Ang Mga Birhen sa Masulog" by Isabel Sebullen
 Second prize: "Lubid" by Leoncio Deriada

Kabataan essay
English
 First prize: "Of Enormous Turnips, Little Books and Life’s Big Lessons" by Enrico Miguel Subido
 Second prize: "The Greatest ‘Trash’ I’ve Read" by Patricia Nicole Golez
 Third prize:  "A Glimpse of Dawn" by Frances Majella Tan Cabahug

Filipino
 First prize: "Bagani Ubbog: Paghahanap sa Tatak ng Angkan" by Reynaldo Bienvenido Duque II
 Second prize: "Ang Libro, Ang Mambabasa, Ang Pagbabago" by Karen Jamora
 Third prize: "Huwag Mo Akong Salingin, Indiong Gusgusin" by Jefferson Capati

More winners by year

References
 

2001
Palanca